Thomas Parke Gere (December 10, 1842 – January 8, 1912) was a Union Army officer who received the Medal of Honor for his actions during the Battle of Nashville in the American Civil War.

Biography
He was born December 10, 1842, in Wellsburg, New York. He enlisted in the 5th Minnesota Volunteer Infantry Regiment at age 19, mustering in on January 17, 1862, at Fort Snelling. He was promoted first sergeant on March 5, 1862, and to second lieutenant on March 24, 1862, and posted to Fort Ridgely as a member of B Company.  He and a few men were on duty at the Lower Sioux Agency at the out break of the Sioux Uprising of 1862.  His commander died at the Battle of Redwood Ferry which made him the senior officer of the garrison.  He was the fort commander only until C Company returned and 1st Lt Sheehan relieved him.   He was later promoted to first lieutenant and then became adjutant. He was awarded the Medal of Honor on February 24, 1865, for his actions at the Battle of Nashville, Tennessee, December 16, 1864. He mustered out on April 5, 1865.

After the war, he was elected a companion of the Iowa Commandery of the Military Order of the Loyal Legion of the United States.

He died January 8, 1912, and was buried in Arlington National Cemetery, Arlington, Virginia, where his grave can be found in section 1, lot 361.

Medal of Honor citation
Rank and organization: First Lieutenant and Adjutant, 5th Minnesota Infantry. Place and date: At Nashville, Tenn., 16 December 1864. Entered service at: ------. Birth: Chemung County, N.Y. Date of issue: 24 February 1865.

Citation:

Capture of flag of 4th Mississippi (C.S.A.).

See also

List of Medal of Honor recipients
List of American Civil War Medal of Honor recipients: G–L

References

External links

United States Army Medal of Honor recipients
United States Army officers
Union Army officers
1842 births
1912 deaths
People from Chemung County, New York
Burials at Arlington National Cemetery
American Civil War recipients of the Medal of Honor
People of Minnesota in the American Civil War